Marcel Soros (b. Marcel Jerome Soros April 24, 1966, Santa Cruz, California) is a professional surfer.

Biography
Growing up at Pleasure Point, Santa Cruz, California, Marcel Soros spends a part of each day surfing and exploring the California coastline.  As a widely recognized professional surfer with over 35 years of surfing experience and 100+ competition wins, he has a vast amount of local knowledge and a great understanding of the local California coastal area and will be happy to tell you all about it.

Career
Men’s Division

1st Santa Cruz 3a Invitational 1984
1st Iceberg Surf Trials (Pro-Am Division) 1985
1st Sam Reid Memorial 1985
2nd O'Neill’s Yea-Now 4th Annual No-Cord Classic 1985
3rd N.S.S.A. Manhattan Open 1984
3rd Winter Surf Festival 1984
3rd Winter Surf Festival (Pro-Am Division) 1984
3rd Iceberg Surf Trials 1984
5th 16th Annual Mabo Royal Surf Meet 1984

Junior Division

1st Oceanside 3a Invitational 1984
1st Sam Reid Memorial 1984
1st Summer Surf Festival 1984
1st Summer Surf Spectacular 1984
1st Kmel Summer Surf Classic 1984
1st Santa Cruz 3a Invitational 1983
1st Summer Surf Festival 1983
1st Summer Surf Festival (Pro-Am Division) 1983
1st Santa Cruz Beach Surf Festival 1983
1st Fall Surf Frolic 1983
1st Sam Reid Memorial 1983
1st Spring Surf Spree 1983
1st Iceberg Surf Trials 1983
1st Iceberg Surf Trial 1982
1st Spring Surf Spree 1982
1st O’neill’s Yea-Now 1st Annual No-Cords Classic 1982
2nd Santa Barbara 3a Invitational 1984
2nd Summer Surf Festival (Pro-Am Division) 1984
2nd Summer Surf Spectacular 1984
2nd Australia’s Team Challenge 1983
2nd Malibu 3a Invitational 1983
2nd Sam Reid Memorial 1983
2nd Fun in the Sun Spree #2 (Pro-Am Division) 1984
2nd Spring Surf Spree #2 (Pro-Am Division) 1983
2nd West Coast Surfing Championships 1982
3rd West Coast Surfing Championships 1984
3rd Spring Surf Spree 1984
3rd Spring Surf Spree (Pro-Am Division) 1984
3rd West Coast Surfing Championships 1983
3rd Fun in the Sun #1(Pro-Am Division) 1983
3rd Santa Cruz 3a Invitational 1982
4th District 4 3a Invitational 1984
4th Fall Surf Frolic (Pro-Am Division) 1983
5th Santa Barbara 3a Invitational 1983
6th Cayucas 3a Invitational 1982
6th Santa Barbara 3a Invitational 1982
6th San Diego 3a Invitational 1982
9th United States Surfing Championships 1984
18th United States Team Trials 1984

Boy’s Division

1st Sam Reid Memorial 1981
1st Spring Surf Spree 1981
1st Summer Surf Festival 1981
1st Fall Surf Frolic 1981
4th Santa Cruz 3a Invitational 1981

Menehue Division

1st Iceberg Surf Trials 1980
1st Spring Surf Spree1980
1st Summer Surf Festival 1980
1st Sam Reid Memorial 1979
1st Fall Surf Frolic 1979

Overall Ratings

1st W.S.A. Junior 1984
1st W.S.A. Junior 1982
2nd W.S.A. Junior 1983

References

“Locals  Only”. Daniel Duane.  Men’s Journal May 2006: pgs. 154-159.
“Cold Water”.  Gwen Mickelson.  Santa Cruz Sentinel 20 Oct. 2004: pgs. A-1, A-10.
“Marcel Soros”.  Adam Repogle.  Inside Surf  June 2001: pg. 30.
“Getting On Board”.  Tom Van Dyke.  San Jose Mercury News 1 July 1998: pg B-1.
“Making waves in a low-profile surf town”.  John Robinson.  Santa Cruz Sentinel 2 Feb. 1989: pg B-4.
“Sorry, only two at once”.  John Robinson.  Santa Cruz Sentinel 29 Jan. 1988: pg. B-2.
“Big waves, big day for locals”.  John Robinson.  Santa Cruz Sentinel date unknown: pgs. B-1, B-5.
“Local sharks hit the water”.  John Robinson.  Santa Cruz Sentinel date unknown: pg.   D-1.
“Something to prove”.  John Robinson.  Santa Cruz Sentinel date unknown: pg. B-1.
“Not all wetsuits created equal”.  John Robinson.  Santa Cruz Sentinel date unknown: pg. B-2.

1966 births
Living people
American surfers